The Galeries Lafayette  is an upmarket French department store chain, the biggest in Europe. Its flagship store is on Boulevard Haussmann in the 9th arrondissement of Paris but it now operates in a number of other locations in France and other countries. In 2019, Galeries Lafayette recorded earnings of over five billion euros. It is a part of the company Groupe Galeries Lafayette and has been a member of the International Association of department stores since 1960.

History 
In 1894, Théophile Bader and his cousin Alphonse Kahn opened a fashion store in a small haberdasher's shop at the corner of rue La Fayette and the Chaussée d'Antin, in Paris.  In 1896, their company purchased the entire building at 1 rue La Fayette; in 1905 they acquired the buildings at 38, 40 and 42 boulevard Haussmann and 15 rue de la Chaussée d'Antin. Bader commissioned the architect Georges Chedanne and his pupil Ferdinand Chanut to design the store at the Haussmann location, where a glass and steel dome and Art Nouveau staircases were finished in 1912.

From 1921 Maurice Dufrêne directed the Maîtrise workshop of the Galeries Lafayette.
This workshop for decorative art and furniture followed the Primavera of the Printemps store founded in 1912 by René Guilleré, Paul Follot's Pomone of Le Bon Marché, and the Studium of the Grands Magasins du Louvre.

As of 2020, Galeries Lafayette has opened more than 50 stores (including subsidiarised stores) in France alone.

Paris Haussmann
Galeries Lafayette Haussmann, the flagship store, is located on Boulevard Haussmann in the 9th arrondissement of Paris, near Opera Garnier, at the corner of Rue La Fayette, close to Chaussée d'Antin – La Fayette Paris Métro station. It is a  fashion flagship store. A wide range of brands are available at the store to suit all budgets, from ready to wear to haute couture. The architecture of the store is art nouveau, with a remarkable dome and a panoramic view of Paris that has made it a tourist attraction of the French capital city. Galeries Lafayette in Paris hosts a popular weekly fashion show for visitors. The

History 
In 1893, Théophile Bader and Alphonse Kahn opened a  store in Paris, on the corner of rue La Fayette and rue de la Chaussée d’Antin, selling novelty gifts. In 1896, the company purchased the entire building at number 1, rue La Fayette followed in 1903 by numbers 38, 40, and 42 on Boulevard Haussmann, as well as number 15, rue de la Chaussée d’Antin.

Aryanization during Nazi occupation 
During Nazi occupation of France in 1940, Les Galeries Lafayette underwent a process of "Aryanization", that is the removal of Jewish owners and their replacement by non-Jewish owners. Théophile Bader, Raoul Meyer, Max Heilbronn, the store's administrators and 129 Jewish employees were forced to resign. The property of Bader, Meyer and Heilbronn families was taken.

The Galeries Lafayette group was transferred to non-Jewish owners: the Swiss Aubert and the French industrialist Harlachol.

Architecture 
Théophile Bader appointed the architect Georges Chedanne to head up the first major renovations which were completed in 1907. This store's inauguration ceremony took place in October 1912.

In 1932, the store was renovated with an Art Déco style by an architect named Pierre Patou.

Fashion and events 
Théophile Bader acquired production facilities in order to make clothing exclusively for Galeries Lafayette under its own private label. He also manufactured affordable versions of designer wear.

This store then expanded to include menswear, furniture, toys and tableware departments and get involved in organizing events such as the rooftop landing by French pilot Jules Védrines in 1919.

In 1922, it opened arts workshops under the artistic direction of Maurice Dufrêne in order to produce affordable furniture, fabric, carpets, wallpaper, pottery, and other household goods.

Following the Second World War, the store underwent a complete makeover.

During the 1950s it hosted large international exhibitions, such as “The Best of Italian Manufacturing” in 1953.

In the 1960s, young designers began launching their ready-to-wear lines at the store. The first designer to become famous was Laura, in 1962. A little while later she went on to become known as Sonia Rykiel.

From 1980 to 1999 “Fashion Festivals”, were organized, in order to select designs for the store. In 1984, the store opened a designer department including designs from, Jean-Paul Gaultier and Thierry Mugler.

From 2001 to 2015, Jean-Paul Goude collaborated with the brand on advertising campaigns in order to give the store a modern identity.

Offer 
Galerie Lafayette Paris Haussmann is a  store. Mostly dedicated to fashion, it also has other offers and services.

Food 
Galeries Lafayette Paris Haussmann's food tasting bars offer French food together with produce from around the world.

Restaurants and bars 
Cafés, bars and restaurants are located in the store for drinks and meals.

The rooftop has a bar, restaurant and terrace with a panoramic view of Paris and its monuments including the Eiffel Tower, the Montparnasse Tower, Invalides, and Opera Garnier.

Cultural space

Galeries Lafayette Paris Haussmann's cultural space “Galerie des Galeries” holds three to four exhibitions a year, showcasing both French and international design.

Events

Every Friday visitors can attend the store's free fashion show at 3pm. These events can only be attended if reservations have been made in advance.

Galeries Lafayette Paris Haussmann has a suspended Christmas tree every year, the first of which was hung from the dome in 1976. The store also organizes a range of exhibitions and shows and during the festive period.

Services 
English-speaking staff in the concierge area help with Wi-Fi access, tourist information, or restaurant and taxi reservations.

The tourist information desk provides information and tickets for transport, museums, attraction parks, guided tours, cruises on the Seine River, cabaret performances, shows and concerts, hotels, and currency exchange.

The store's geolocation app helps shoppers find brands and access restaurants, customer service, and shop locations.

The tax refund service enables non-European residents to claim back their tax refund, based on the 12% tax they have paid on their purchases worth over €175.01 made on the day of purchase at Galeries Lafayette.

A personal shopper is also available and VIP services include the ordering of limousines or package deliveries to hotels.

The information office, located on the ground floor, provides information related to all the services offered by the store.

Other stores

Overseas stores

Berlin, Germany - The store in Berlin in Germany was designed by Jean Nouvel and constructed between 1991 and 1995. It is located on Friedrichstraße two blocks south of the Under den Linden U-Bahn station, and opened in 1996.
Dubai, UAE - A Galeries Lafayette store opened in Dubai Mall on 18 May 2009. In February 2011, the store unveiled Dubai's first gold ATM.  Shoppers can insert cash and receive a corresponding amount of gold nuggets or coins.
Jakarta, Indonesia - Galeries Lafayette opened their first store in South East Asia after 21 years in the summer of 2013 at the Pacific Place Mall. The store, occupies four floors, operated in partnership with PT. Mitra Adiperkasa Tbk., who also operated Japanese department stores Sogo and Seibu.
Beijing, China - Galeries Lafayette open its first location in Beijing, China in fall 2013 covers a total area of over 47,000 square meters spreading over 6 floors. The store operated as a 50-50 joint venture between the French company and the Hong Kong-based fashion retailer I.T.
Istanbul, Turkey - Galeries Lafayette opened its first location in Istanbul's Emaar Square Mall in May 2017, in partnership with DEMSA Group.
Shanghai, China - Galeries Lafayette and its partner I.T opened Galeries Lafayette's second flagship store in Shanghai's L+Mall in Lujiazui, Pudong on 25 October 2019.
Doha, Qatar - On April 15, 2019 Galeries Lafayette Open its store in 21 High Street, the store covers a total area of over 14,500 square meters, operating in partnership with Ali Bin Ali Group.
Luxembourg - Galeries Lafayette opened its Luxembourg store on November 30, 2019 in partnership with CODIC, located within the Royal-Hamilius urban planning project built by Norman Foster.

Overseas stores planned
Milan, Italy - In June 2014, Galeries Lafayette announced that it will open its first location in Italy. The group have reached an agreement with Westfield and Gruppo Stilo - two leading international mall specialists - to open their first and wholly owned  store in Milan within Westfield Milano, the expected largest mall in Italy.
Macau, China - The upcoming Treasure Island Hotel Macau will house Galeries Lafayette in a  space, brought by Forward Fashion Holdings. The store will open in Q4 of  2022.
Chonqing, China - A store will open at the Chonqing 100 Mall in Southwest China in late 2022.
India - Two stores are set to open in Mumbai and Delhi in partnership with Aditya Birla Group. The Mumbai store will be in the Fort district in two heritage buildings with the interior designed by Virgile & Partners this store is set to open in 2024. The Delhi store will open at the DLF Emporio in 2025.

Closed stores
New York City - A Galleries Lafayette location opened in the building adjacent to Trump Tower in New York City in September 1991.  It was unsuccessful, and closed after three years.
Singapore - A Lafayette location also opened at Singapore at Orchard Road below the Le Méridien Hotel, moved to the Liat Towers, and closed in 1992.
Casablanca - In 2008, the store announced a licensing agreement to open a store in Morocco Mall in 2010, before closing its doors in 2016. The Casablanca store in Morocco Mall was designed by Davide Padoa of Design International. The project site coordination was led by Miguel Fernandes and Catia Zizzi. Galeries Lafayette previously operated a store in Casablanca from the 1920s through the early 1970s.
London - A branch opened in Regent Street in 1920, closing in 1972. The site is now occupied by Hamleys.

Galeries Lafayette Group 

The Galeries Lafayette Group has its head office in Paris.

The Group owns the following subsidiaries:
 Galeries Lafayette
 Bazar de l'Hôtel de Ville (BHV)
 La Redoute
 Mauboussin
 Royal Quartz
 Louis Pion
 Nouvelles Galeries
 Lafayette Gourmet

See also

Arcaffe

References

External links 

 Galeries Lafayette department stores website 
 Galeries Lafayette Group website 

1912 establishments in France
Art Nouveau architecture in Paris
Art Nouveau retail buildings
Buildings and structures in the 9th arrondissement of Paris
Retail companies established in 1912
Commercial buildings completed in 1912
Department stores of France
Food halls
Retail companies of France
Shops in Paris
Companies acquired from Jews under Nazi rule